One Thousand Ropes is a 2017 New Zealand drama film directed by Tusi Tamasese. It was screened in the Panorama section at the 67th Berlin International Film Festival. It was selected as the New Zealand entry for the Best Foreign Language Film at the 90th Academy Awards, but was not nominated.

Plot
A Samoan father and his daughter reunite and face their past together.

Cast
 Frankie Adams
 Uelese Petaia
 Beulah Koale
 Ene Petaia
 Anapela Polataivao
 Sima Urale

Reception 

On Rotten Tomatoes, the film has an aggregate  score of 100% based on 7 positive critic reviews.

See also
 List of submissions to the 90th Academy Awards for Best Foreign Language Film
 List of New Zealand submissions for the Academy Award for Best Foreign Language Film

References

External links
 

2017 films
2017 drama films
New Zealand drama films
Samoan-language films